The Canton of Geneva, officially the Republic and Canton of Geneva, is one of the 26 cantons forming the Swiss Confederation. It is composed of forty-five municipalities, and the seat of the government and parliament is in the City of Geneva.

Geneva is the French-speaking westernmost canton of Switzerland. It lies at the western end of Lake Geneva and on both sides of the Rhone, its main river. Within the country, the canton shares borders with Vaud to the east, the only adjacent canton. However, the borders of the canton are essentially international, with the French region of Auvergne-Rhône-Alpes. As is the case in several other Swiss cantons (Ticino, Neuchâtel, and Jura), Geneva is referred to as a republic within the Swiss Confederation.

One of the most populated cantons, Geneva is considered one of the most cosmopolitan regions of the country. As a center of the Calvinist Reformation, the city of Geneva has had a great influence on the canton, which essentially consists of the city and its suburbs. Notable institutions of international importance based in the canton are the University of Geneva, the United Nations, the International Committee of the Red Cross and CERN.

History 

The Canton of Geneva, whose official name is the Republic and Canton of Geneva, is the successor of the Republic of Geneva.

This article focuses on the history of the canton, which begins in 1815, and some of the context leading to modern borders and events after that date. For more detail on the history of Geneva prior to that year, refer to the history of the city of Geneva.

Territorial evolution of the canton

Context 
Compared to other urban cantons of Switzerland (Zurich, Berne, Basel before it split, Fribourg, Lucerne), Geneva's geographical size is relatively small. 

Geneva was controlled by the Allobroges, a rich and powerful Celtic tribe until 121 BC, when they were defeated by the Roman Empire. The city was then annexed to the Roman Empire in 121 BC and attached to Gallia Narbonensis province. Its political importance in the region was low, but it soon developed an important economy owing to the city's port that facilitated trade over Lake Geneva from the routes joining from Seyssel and Annecy towards the Roman colonies of Nyon and Avenches. The city remained part of the Empire until 443 when, welcomed by the Romans, the Burgundians settle in an ill-defined region named Sapaudia and Geneva is chosen as the capital of the newly formed kingdom for its 20 first years due to the city's economic importance as well as the prestige of its Bishop. As the kingdom began expanding towards Lyon and Grenoble, Geneva lost its central geographical location of the kingdom and for a time became a secondary capital until the kingdom was divided between Godegisel and Gundobad, sons of Gondioc. Godegisel settled in Geneva from which he controlled the northern bishoprics. The nature of the political relationship between both brothers is not well known, but in the year 500 the kingdoms went to war, during which Godegisel was defeated and Geneva pillaged and destroyed.

In 532, the Burgundians were conquered by the Francs, who administratively divide the area in three parts: one centred on the city of Besançon, one around Dijon, and the last one, the Pagus Ultraioranus ("Transjurane") includes the cities of Geneva, Nyon, Sion, and Avenches. Given the peripheral location of Geneva within this region, it lost its status of capital, although it kept a certain religious prestige.  In 864, Conrad II acquired the title of Duke of Transjurane and in 888 his son Rudolph I becomes king of the second kingdom of Burgundy after seizing the opportunity of death of Charles the Fat. At its maximum extent around the year 1000, the new kingdom extends from Provence to Basel and controls the main alpine passes of the region. In this context, Geneva regains its importance as the city was located in the intersection between several important roads connecting Italy to Northern Europe via the western Alps mountain passes of Mont Cenis and Great St Bernard Pass.

However, by the end of the 10th century the kingdom was engulfed in several conflicts between the king's power and the aristocracy. Notably for Geneva, some of the most important nobles began to offer some lands to the Church, such as in 912 when Eldegarde (probably a Countess in an area near Nyon) gave up her lands in the area of Satigny which eventually became the Mandement, or in 962 when Queen Berthe offered lands in Saint-Genis. The income of the Kingdom suffered from these transfers of lands and, in an attempt to stop the process, in 995 King Rudolph III tried to withdraw the hereditary rights away from some of his nobles. However, the King was defeated in this power struggle, and this led to a weakening of the central power. As the King weakened, some of his local officers such as the Counts rejected his authority and even opposed him. Several independent fiefdoms emerge from this time, including the County of Geneva.

In 1032 Rudolph III dies without an heir. The Kingdom of Burgundy then reverts to HRE Conrad II, who tries to re-assert control of the lands by rallying the nobles who opposed Rodolph III. In exchange for his loyalty, Gerold, count of Geneva, obtains full powers over his County, becomes a direct vassal of the Emperor and so his lands became part of the Holy Roman Empire.

However, it is not clear how the power over the city proper was shared between the Prince-Bishopric of Geneva and the counts. Thus, a power struggle between both ensued in which the counts received the support from the canons of the chapter, a large majority of whom were members of vassal families of the count. The apex of the count's power took place from 1078 to 1129, when Count Aymon I managed to get his brother Guy de Faucigny appointed as bishop of Geneva. Aymon took advantage of this situation by transferring the administration of some of the lands away from the Diocese of Geneva to the priory of Saint-Victor of which he was became protector at the request of the Bishop, and siphons the resources of the priory to himself.The successor of Guy de Faucigny, Bishop Humbert de Grammont, was outraged by this situation, and requests the restitution of the churches transferred to the administration of the Count. The outcome of the Gregorian Reform materialises in the council of Vienne of 1124 which legislated on securing the ecclesiastical rights and possessions of the church. Pope Callixtus II then pressures Aymon to return the Church's estates, going as far as excommunicating him. The Count repents, and greets the Bishop on the border of his County in Seyssel as the Bishop was on his way back to Geneva from Vienne, whose Bishop had been tasked by the Pope to mediate in the conflict. There, they conclude a treaty (the Traité de Seyssel), whereby the Count restitutes to the Bishop of Geneva some of the churches whose rights and revenues he had acquired. Although this treaty did not fully solve the conflict, which only got fully resolved by the treaty of Saint-Sigismond in 1156 which confirmed all the provisions, it marked an important step for Geneva as the count also gave up his temporal rights over the City of Geneva to the Bishop, except for the right to execute criminal sentences. The following bishops, Arducius de Faucigny (1135-1185) and Nantelme (1185-1205) keep eroding the counts' power. The touchstone of this erosion of power is the acquisition of the Imperial immediacy by the Prince-Bishopric in 1154, which designates the Bishop of Geneva as a Prince of the Empire and, by right, the only lord of the city after the Emperor,  a status employed several times by the Bishops in the defence of their independence from local rulers. As a result, some time around 1219 the Counts of Geneva completely quit the city and move their capital to Annecy, which marks important step for the future evolution of the canton of Geneva, as for the first time there was a complete separation of the ruling of the city of Geneva, by the Bishops, from the ruling of its hinterlands, the Counts.

At the same time, the county was in a continuous power struggle with the House of Savoy, which by the middle of the 12th century governed a vast principality centred on the control of the main mountain passes of the western Alps. By the beginning of the 13th century, the Counts of Geneva were facing an alliance of the Maison de Faucigny, de Gex, as well as the counts of Savoy. After several decades of wars of the gebenno-faucigneran conflict of 1205-1250, the counts of Geneva lost all their main lands and fortresses. In the Treaty of Paris (1355), Savoy is awarded the Faucigny and Gex, leaving the counts of Geneva as secondary regional actors. After the death of antipope count Robert in 1394, the county passes to the house of Thoire-Villars, who were related to the house of Geneva. However, some of the local nobility was displeased with the outcome and, profiting from the situation, the County of Geneva finally disappears when it is sold to Amadeus VIII of Savoy for 45,000 gold francs on 5 August 1401.The count of Savoy then restarts the conflict with the Bishops of Geneva as he intends to retake control of the city and make it the count's capital. He initially fails in this task, but Amadeus VIII manages to get elected as antipope Felix V in 1439. When Bishop François de Metz dies in 1444, Amadeus becomes the administrator of the bishopric and becomes de facto, but not de jure, ruler of the city.

When he renounced his position as Pope, he kept a degree of control over the city, and succeeded in agreeing that the future Bishops of Geneva must be designated by the house of Savoy. Two of his grandchildren became Bishops, and it was at this time that Genevans, fearing for their Independence, first concluded a treaty of alliance in 1477 with the Swiss cantons of Berne and Fribourg, but not without reprisals by Duke Charles III against those who organised the alliance. For a time, the city was divided between those who supported the Duke (the Mammelus) and those whose supported the Swiss Confederation (the ). In 1525, Charles III, in the “Council of the Hallebardes” forced the city authorities to promise to not form an alliance with the Swiss. However, the Eidguenots negotiated a new alliance with Berne and Fribourg, concluded in 1526. At the time there were few Protestants in Geneva, but after the alliance with Berne, which had already fully adopted the reformation, some Genevans were attracted to Protestantism, led by preachers such as Guillaume Farel. A few years later, in 1533, the Catholic Bishop of Geneva Pierre de la Baume finally quit Geneva, and all the assets of the church in the city and its lands were confiscated by the secular authorities.

Charles III took advantage of this situation to attempt to conquer the city in 1535–36, but an army of Bernese in alliance with France defeated Savoy and occupied the lands of the Savoy in the Genevan basin (including all the Pays de Gex). On 21May 1536, the General Council of Geneva fully adopted the reformation; with this decision the commune of Geneva merged with new institutions, including the territories that depended on the Bishop, the mandements. This act of independence marked the birth of the Republic of Geneva, then still mostly confined to the city and the few medieval territories gifted to the Bishops, the largest of which were Satigny, Peney, and an area around modern-day Jussy.

The son of Charles III, Emmanuel Philibert, defeated the army of French king Henri II in the battle of Saint-Quentin in 1557 and recovered the lands conquered by the French. However, Berne did not participate in the initial negotiations, and only in the Treaty of Lausanne of 1564 did Savoy recover the lands around Geneva, while losing forever the Pays de Vaud to Berne. Until his death, Emmanuel-Philibert practiced tolerance with his non-Catholic subjects and largely respected the "" principle for Geneva. However, his son, Charles Emmanuel I began plotting against Protestants and employed mercenaries to intimidate the Protestants converted by Bernese preachers. In response, Geneva intermittently occupied the Pays de Gex from 1589, but the city was finally forced to abandon it when France defeated Savoy and annexed the Pays de Gex for itself in the Treaty of Lyon of 1601. This marked the point where most of Geneva's hinterland was divided between two different strong states along the Rhone banks: the Kingdom of France on the east, and the Duchy of Savoy on the west.This event largely explains why, unlike the Swiss urban cantons mentioned in the introduction, Geneva was unable to expand geographically, as its borders were dominated by those two powerful states which, at the same time, and since the failed attempt of 1602 to take the city, largely respected Geneva's independence protected by its strong walls, guaranteed by its alliance with the Protestant cantons of the Old Swiss Confederacy of Zurich and Berne, and respected by France, an ally of the old Swiss confederacy.

Since then, no major changes occurred in Geneva's borders until 1749. In an effort to rationalise the borders marked by the medieval territories gifted to the Bishops in the Middle Ages, the Republic and France exchanged territories in that year: Geneva swapped its rights over Challex, Thoiry, Fenières, and some enclaves it possed in the Pays de Gex, for Chancy, Avully, and Russin. In a similar treaty with Savoy in 1754, Geneva received from Savoy Cartigny, Jussy, Vandoeuvres, Gy, and some other smaller territories, in exchange for its rights on Carouge, Veyrier, Onex, Lancy, Bossey, Presinge, and others.

During the baroque and classical periods, Europe saw the emergence of several planned towns. Save for the reconstruction of towns destroyed by fires (such as Schwyz in 1642, Sion in 1788, or La Chaux-de-Fonds in 1794), Switzerland did not jump on this trend mostly circumscribed to the large monarchies and princely states. However, the desire to possess or weaken Geneva by France and Savoy provides two good examples of this urban planning, both of which are now Genevan towns. In the 18th century under Louis XV, France intended to build a large port city in Versoix to deviate the traffic en route to Lake Geneva and from there to the Swiss confederation. The city, intended for around 30,000 inhabitants, would have been bigger than Geneva (by then the largest Swiss city) and included large squares and ports. Voltaire, who had settled in Ferney, was particularly rejoiced about the idea of ruining Geneva. However, opposition from Berne to a new fortified town in its border in Pays de Gex, and budgetary problems in France, finally stopped the project of which few items finally were built and survive. A more lasting project was launched by Savoy in 1777, which transformed Carouge into the gateway to the northern provinces and conferred the village the status of city in 1786. The planned city was particularly innovative in the way that streets were symmetrically laid and by the total absence of fortifications.

The modern canton 

The French Revolution reached Geneva in 1792, and in February 1794, the Republic gave itself a new, revolutionary constitution which proclaimed the equality of all citizens. Like many men from the Lumières, Robespierre idealised the Old Swiss Confederation as the home of William Tell, the land where men had already freed themselves from feudal lords. Although misguided, this means that he was mostly favourable to respect the confederation's neutrality. However, after the death of Robespierre in July of the same year, there was a counter-revolution, which gained the upper hand by 1796.

Robespierre's death prompted the French invasion of 1798, and the annexation of Geneva which became the capital of the French . The Napoleonic army left Geneva on 30 December 1813, and on the next day the return of the Republic was proclaimed.

Following these events that transformed Switzerland under the Helvetic Republic, Geneva joined the Swiss Confederation in 1815 as the 22nd canton. The territory of the present canton of Geneva was largely established as a result of the Congress of Vienna, in order to provide contiguity between the city of Geneva and its satellite territories established during the previous negotiations with France and Savoy, such as the Mandement, and to physically join the canton to the rest of Switzerland.

During the negotiations, the authorities were split between those who sought to maximise the gain in territory for the new canton at the expense of France and Sardinia, and the conservatives who wanted to minimise the gain in territory to avoid including a large number of Catholics in the new canton. The former were led by Charles Pictet de Rochemont, a Genevan statesmen and diplomat. The conservatives, formed largely of old Genevan aristocracy, were led by Joseph des Arts who in addition preferred to keep Geneva's independence. However, in the end neither side got what they wanted as larger events dominated the situation.

Charles Pictet de Rochemont was tasked with the negotiations with the powers in Paris and later Vienna. In his initial plans presented to the Emperor Alexander I, he suggested a new canton extending from the summits of the Jura surrounding the city (Crêt de la Neige), all the way to mount Salève and les Voirons. This, therefore, included the Pays de Gex and all the lands in the Genevan basin. In part of these negotiations, it was even suggested to transfer the area of Porrentruy to France in exchange for the Pays de Gex. However, Louis XVIII was adamantly opposed to transferring catholic subjects to the "Protestant Rome", so France did not have to cede any territory to Geneva in the Peace of Paris in May 1814. Only after the return of Napoleon and the second Treaty of Paris Geneva could achieve limited territorial gains to link to the canton to Vaud and break the isolation of the enclaves in the Mandement. One town in particular, Ferney, continues to act today as a bottleneck in the connection to the rest of the country, as France was emotionally attached to the chosen home of Voltaire and refused to cede it. The negotiations with France were concluded by the Treaty of Paris of 1815, whereby the canton added the current municipalities of Versoix (which provided the geographical link with neighbouring Vaud), Collex-Bossy, Pregny-Chambésy, Vernier, Meyrin and Grand-Saconnex.

In similar negotiations with the Kingdom of Sardinia, Charles Pictet de Rochemont pursued the acquisition of the lands adjoining Geneva and included the slopes of mount Salève. However, Turin opposed this demand as the area contained the important road linking Thonon-les-Bains and the Faucigny with Annecy. In the end, the diplomat managed to swap this demand, as well as a demand for a longer portion of the coastline of the lake, for a large gain in territory from Chancy to Geneva (what is now the Campagne), as well as lands around the mandement of Jussy. These negotiations were concluded by the Treaty of Turin of 1816 with Sardinia, from which the new canton gained the present municipalities of Laconnex, Soral, Perly-Certoux, Plan-les-Ouates, Bernex, Aire-la-Ville, Onex, Confignon, Lancy, Bardonnex, Troinex, Veyrier, Chêne-Thônex, Puplinge, Presinge, Choulex, Meinier, Collonge-Bellerive, Corsier, Hermance, Anières, and Carouge.

In total, the canton added 159 square kilometres of territory, settled with over 16,000 inhabitants, mostly catholic and rural. At the time, the city and its possessions had 29,000 inhabitants.

Initially, many of the new villages were grouped together by the Genevan government. For example, the hamlets of Avusy, Soral, and Laconnex formed one single municipality. The same occurred to Bernex, Onex, and Confignon, or to Plan-les-Ouates, Bardonnex, Perly, and Certoux (the four villages formed 'Compèsieres').  However, the Paris and Turin treaties did not deal with the issue of common land in those villages (nor with the issue of common land that was now separated by international borders). This resulted into tensions as villagers did not want to share their local common land with villagers from the same municipality as the distribution of land and the resulting revenue was highly uneven. A cantonal law from 5 February 1849 required municipal acts be voted by counsellors, and to identify in the minutes the position of each counsellor and the reason for their vote. This increased transparency but it led to tensions related to the placement of schools, townhalls and other public buildings and services in addition to the issue on communal lands. Eventually, these tensions led to the separation of those villages in the second half of the 19th century, which led to the present-day municipal borders for those newly acquired lands.

The last municipal border change occurred in 1931. As a result of a push towards the rationalisation of resources following the 1920s economic crisis, the municipalities that formed the ancient urban part of the Republic of Geneva (Eaux-Vives, le Petit-Saconnex, Plainpalais, and Geneva) merged to form the modern city of Geneva.

In 1956, as a result of the planned expansion of Geneva Airport, both countries agreed to exchange a piece of territory to fit in the new runway, affecting the French municipality of Ferney-Voltaire.

The last change of the canton's borders occurred in 2003, when the construction of the border crossing in the new section of highway linking the Swiss A1 to the French A41 required an exchange of territories. Land was transferred from the municipality of Bardonnex, to St-Julien-en-Genevois. To compensate for the loss of Genevan soil, the municipality of Soral gained territory from Viry and St-Julien.

Modern history 
Cross border cooperation began only a century after the creation of the canton. In 1913, an agreement was sealed between Switzerland and France to build the Chancy-Pougny electric dam. Completed in 1925 to supply energy to the steel mills in Creusot, it began to supply electricity to the Services Industriels de Genève by 1958.

Cross-border working movements had existed in Geneva since the Middle Ages and the city was traditionally more open to immigration than others. Around the year 1700, Swiss cities and their allies such as Geneva, had two types of residents: the bourgeois, who held political rights (and a minority of whom formed the patrician class), and the inhabitants, who had no say in the ruling of the city. Amongst the latter, there were the 'established', who had full residence permits, and the 'tolerated' with time-limited permits. The proportion of bourgeois over the total residents in Basle was 70% in 1795; 61% in Zurich in 1780, and 26% in Geneva in 1781. The proportion of 'inhabitants' in Zurich in 1795 was of 8%, whereas in Geneva, a more liberal city, it was 46% in 1764. Note that the remaining residents were 'foreigners', people from other villages and cities.

Building on the liberal roots, in 1882 a convention allowed French citizens a certain degree of freedom to work in Switzerland and vice versa. However, the 1950s and 1960s were years of very high economic growth in Geneva. This led to an increasing need to employ workers from across the border, from Pays de Gex and the Haute-Savoie - from 6,750 workers in 1966 to 22,500 in 1972. Since Geneva refused to participate in the Franco-Swiss agreements for the distribution of income taxes levied on cross border workers of 1935 and 1966 that covered all the other cantons, the municipalities from the neighbouring French regions were increasingly suffocated by the need to finance public equipment for a population that did not financially contribute to the budgets. This situation led to a first grouping of municipalities to defend their interests, the “Association de Communes Frontalières”. Acknowledging the problem, Geneva agreed in 1973 to transfer 3.5% of the gross income of those workers directly to the French municipalities, equivalent to around CHF330 million/year nowadays.

Cooperation increased following the 1980 Madrid accords on the Outline Convention on Transfrontier Co-operation. However, it was the 2002 agreement on the free movement of people between the European Union and Switzerland that had a bigger impact on Geneva's economy and society. The number of cross-border workers increased from 35,000 in 2002 to 92,000 in 2020. This vastly increased the need for cooperation, notably in transportation. It led to the creation of the “Agglomeration Franco-Valdo-Genevoise”, later renamed “Grand Genève“ in 2012, which roughly corresponds in geographical extension to the 1-million inhabitants metropolitan area of Geneva extending beyond the cantonal borders across Vaud, Ain, and Haute-Savoie. Its major achievements include the push towards the construction and operation of the Léman Express rail network and the projected extensions of the tpg tram network to Annemasse, St-Julien-en-Genevois, and Ferney-Voltaire.

Coat of arms 

The elements of its coat of arms are:
Shield: showing the Imperial Eagle and a Key of St. Peter (symbolizing the status of Geneva as Reichsstadt and as episcopal seat, respectively), in use since the 15th century. 
Crest in the form of half a sun inscribed with ΙΗΣ (for Jesus Hominum Salvator)
The motto: Post Tenebras Lux

The current coat of arms, adopted from the city of Geneva, represent the union of the semi-eagle originating from the two-headed eagle from the Holy Roman Empire, in which Geneva formed part in the Middle Ages, and the gold key from the coat of arms of the bishopric of Geneva, symbolising the Key of St. Peter, patron saint of the cathedral. The bishop was a direct vassal of the emperor and he exercised in his name the temporal power over the city. Symbolising the union of spiritual and mortal powers, the coat of arms were adopted by the citizens of Geneva in 1387. The old colours of Geneva were grey and black and changed to black and purple in the 17th century. Gold and red began to be used from the 18th century.

The crest with the sun and the ΙΗΣ inscription, denoting the first three letters of the Greek name of Jesus, exists since the 15th century but was used on the coat of arms until the 16th century.

The motto of Geneva, Post Tenebras Lux, stands in Latin for "light after darkness", appears in the Vulgate version of Job 17:12. The phrase was adopted as the Calvinist motto later by the entire Protestant Reformation and by Geneva.

Geography 
Geneva is the flattest canton of Switzerland, with a height difference of only 184 metres between its lowest and highest point. However, it is surrounded across its borders by the numerous mountains of the Jura and Alpine foothills, notably the Crêt de la Neige and its neighbour Le Reculet (the highest, and second-highest peaks of the Jura, respectively), the Salève, the Voirons,  and La Dôle (in Vaud territory).

The canton of located in the extreme west of Switzerland. Excluding the exclave of the municipality of Céligny, the canton shares 95% of its border with France: 103 km out a total of 107.5 km, the remaining 4.5 km are shared with Vaud.

Geneva is surrounded by the French departments of the Ain to its west, and that of the Haute Savoie to the East and South, and the canton of Vaud to the north.

The canton is located in the Genevan basin. The region is bordered by the Lake Geneva and traversed by the major rivers of the Rhone flowing out of the lake and the Arve, whose source is located in the Mont-Blanc region. It is encircled by the Jura on its north-west; by the Vuache to its west, split from the Jura by the Rhone valley and protected by the Fort l'Écluse; by the Mont-de-Sion to the South; by the Salève to the south-east, a mountain locals refer to as the "mountain of Genevans" despite being located in France due to its easy access and proximity; and to the east are the Alps, whose highest peak, the Mont-Blanc, is often visible from many parts of the canton.

To the north-east of Salève, in Monniaz (municipality of Jussy), is located the highest point of the canton at 516 metres above sea level. The lowest point of the canton is along the Rhône south of Chancy at 332 metres.

The canton contains both the urban landscape of the city of Geneva and its surrounding towns, and a well-preserved rural landscape. The Mandement, in the north-west of the canton, is a partial valley dug by the river Allondon, a tributary of the Rhone, and regrouping the major wine-making towns of Satigny, Russin, and Dardagny. The Verbois dam built over the Rhone in that area supplies around 15% of the electricity needs of the canton and it links the Mandement to Champagne, on the opposite side of the river, between the towns of Russin and Aire-la-Ville.

Chancy, the westernmost municipality of Switzerland, is located in Champagne. The slope raises gently from the Rhone towards the main town of the region, Bernex, culminating in the Signal at 509.9 metres, the second-highest point of the canton. This region contains several historical villages such as Sézegnin, Athenaz, Avusy, Laconnex, Soral, Cartigny, and Avully, transferred to Geneva from the Duchy of Savoy in 1815.

At its narrowest point, the canton measures 2.1 km between the lake in Vegneron and the French border in Ferney-Voltaire. As this is the only territory connecting the canton towards the rest of Switzerland, this small piece of land is crossed by the main railway towards Lausanne and Neuchâtel; the A1 highway and its interchange; several roads; the international airport; two high-voltage electric lines; a gaz pipeline; an oil pipeline; and a bicycle path.

Politics

Municipalities

There are 45 municipalities in the canton.

The canton of Geneva is not divided into any administrative districts. There were 13 cities with a population of over 10,000 as of :
 Geneva,  
 Vernier,  
 Lancy,  
 Meyrin,  
 Carouge,  
 Onex,  
 Thônex,  
 Versoix,  
 Le Grand-Saconnex,  
 Chêne-Bougeries,  
 Veyrier,  
 Plan-les-Ouates,  
 Bernex,

Government
The constitution of the canton was established in 1847 and has since been amended several times. The cantonal executive government (Conseil d'État) has seven members, who are elected for five years.

The last regular election for the legislation 2018-2023 were held on 15 April 2018 and 6 May 2018.

Michèle Righetti is the chancellor of the canton (Chancilière d'Etat) since 2018.

Parliament

The legislature, the Grand Council (Grand Conseil), has 100 seats, with deputies elected for four years at a time.

The last election was held on 15 April 2018.

In a similar way to what happens at the Federal level, any change to the Constitution is subject to compulsory referendum. In addition, any law can be subject to a referendum if it is demanded by 7,000 persons entitled to vote, and 10,000 persons may also propose a new law.

Federal elections

National Council
In 2019 the Republic and Canton of Geneva gained a seat and sent a total of 12 representatives to the National Council. The federal election held on 20 October 2019 did result in an electoral breakthrough for the Green Party (PES/GPS) which for the first time was the most popular party with a vote share of 24.6%. The Liberals (PLR/FDP) were relegated to the second place, losing 2.6% of their vote share and a seat in the National Council. Two mandates were also allotted to the Social Democratic Party (PS/SP) and the UDC/SVP receiving 14.7% or 13.7% respectively. The Christian Democratic People's Party (PDC/CVP) managed to hold their seat with 7.7% while the  coalition gained 7.4% of the votes and a seat. The election also resulted in the Geneva Citizens' Movement (MCG) losing their only seat with a decreased vote share of 5.4% compared to 7.9% in 2015. Voter turnout decreased to 38.2%, the lowest recorded among all cantons in 2019.

Council of States
The last elections to the Council of States (Switzerland) were held in two rounds taking place on 20 October 2019 and 10 November 2019 within the federal elections. The election resulted in two new members being seated after the second round of voting. Councillor Lisa Mazzone of the Green Party (PES/GPS) was elected with 45,998 votes and councillor Carlo Sommaruga, member of the Social Democratic Party (PS/SP) was elected with 41,839 votes. Outgoing councillors were Liliane Maury Pasquier of the Social Democratic Party and  Robert Cramer of the Green Party which were both first elected in 2007. Both parties therefore maintained their representation in the council.

Federal election results

 FDP before 2009, FDP.The Liberals after 2009
 "*" indicates that the party was not on the ballot in this canton.
 Part of the FDP for this election
 Combined with the SD for this election
 Part of the EAG coalition for this election
 Part of the MCR coalition for this election

Demographics 

In 2013, the population included 194,623 foreign-born residents, from 187 different nations, comprising 40.1% of the total population.

The population of the canton, contained 168,505 people originally from Geneva (35.4%) and 112,878 Swiss from other cantons (23.7%). About 73% of foreign-born residents were from Europe (EU28: 64.4%), 9.1% from Africa, 9.0% from the Americas, and 8.5% from Asia. Including people holding multiple citizenship, 54.4% of people living in Geneva held a foreign passport.

In 2014, the predominant language of Geneva was French, spoken by 81.04% of the population at home; the next largest home languages were English (10.84%), Portuguese (9.89%), Spanish (7.82%) and German (5.32%); respondents were permitted to report more than one language.

Religion 

As home of John Calvin's Reformation, the canton of Geneva has traditionally been a Protestant Christian stronghold. However, during the 19th and 20th centuries, the Roman Catholic population of the canton increased dramatically, largely due to the expansion of the border in 1815 towards Catholic areas and to immigration from Catholic European countries; their community numbered 220,139 people or 44.5% . Roman Catholics now outnumber members of the Swiss Reformed Church (65,629 people or 13.3% ) in the canton by far; . The surrounding regions of France are mostly Roman Catholic.

In 2012, 5.4% of the Genevan population (aged 15 years and older) belonged to other Christian groups, 5.5% were Muslims, and 5.9% belonged to other religious groups. The remainder of the population was religiously unaffiliated or did not answer the census question.

Historical population 
The historical population is given in the following table:

Economy 

Despite its relatively small size compared to other Swiss cantons, the canton of Geneva generates the fourth largest GDP of the country (CHF 50bn), behind the cantons of Zurich (CHF 143bn), Berne (CHF 78bn), and Vaud (CHF 54bn), and enjoys the third-largest GDP per capita in the country behind Basel-City and Zug

Geneva's economy is largely service-driven. The canton consistently ranks as one of the strongest global financial centres. Three main sectors dominate the financial sector: commodity trading; trade finance, and wealth management.

Around a third of the world's free traded oil, sugar, grains and oil seeds is traded in Geneva. Approximately 22% of the world's cotton is traded in the Lake Geneva region. Other major commodities traded in the canton include steel, electricity, or coffee. Large trading companies have their regional or global headquarters in the canton, such as Trafigura, Cargill, Vitol, Gunvor, BNP Paribas, or Mercuria Energy Group, in addition to being home to the world's largest shipping company, Mediterranean Shipping Company. Commodity trading is supported by a strong trade finance sector, with large banks such as BCGE, Banque de Commerce et de Placements, BCV, Crédit Agricole, Credit Suisse, ING, Société Générale, and UBS, all having their headquarters in the area for this business.

Wealth management is dominated by non-publicly listed banks, particularly Pictet, Lombard Odier, Union Bancaire Privée, Edmond de Rothschild Group, Mirabaud Group, Dukascopy Bank, Bordier & Cie, Banque SYZ, or REYL & Cie. In addition, the canton is home to the largest concentration of foreign-owned banks in Switzerland, such as HSBC Private Bank, JPMorgan Chase, Bank of China, Barclays, or Arab Bank.

Behind the financial sector, the next largest major economic sector is watchmaking, dominated by luxury firms Rolex, Richemont, Patek Philippe, and others, whose factories are mostly concentrated in the municipalities of Plan-les-Ouates and Meyrin.

Trade finance, wealth management, and watchmaking, approximately contribute two-thirds of the corporate tax paid in the canton

Other large multinationals are also headquartered in the canton, such as Firmenich (in Satigny), and Givaudan (in Vernier), the world's two largest manufacturers of flavours, fragrances and active cosmetic ingredients; SGS, the world's largest inspection, verification, testing and certification services company; Alcon (in Vernier), a company specialising in eye-care products; Temenos, a large banking software provider; or the local headquarters for Procter & Gamble, Japan Tobacco International, or L'Oréal.

Although they do not directly contribute to the local economy, the canton of Geneva is also host to the world's largest concentration of international organisations and UN agencies, such as the Red Cross, the World Health Organization, the World Trade Organization, the International Telecommunication Union, the World Intellectual Property Organization, the World Meteorological Organization, and the International Labour Organization, as well as the European headquarters of the United Nations.

Its international mindedness, well-connected airport, and centrality in the continent, also make Geneva a good destination for congresses and trade fairs, of which the largest two are the Geneva Motor Show and Watches & Wonders, both held in Palexpo.

Agriculture is commonplace in the hinterlands of Geneva, particularly wheat and wine. Despite its relatively small size, the canton produces around 10% of the Swiss wine and has the highest vineyard density in the country. The largest strains grown in Geneva are gamay, chasselas, pinot noir, gamaret, and chardonnay.

Transport 

Geneva is linked to the rest of Switzerland with trains operated by the Swiss Federal Railways, with main lines towards Brig in the canton of Valais via Lausanne, to St. Gallen via Lausanne, Fribourg, Bern and Zurich or alternatively via Neuchâtel on the Jura Foot Railway, and to Lucerne.

Since 1984 the French high-speed trains (TGV) serve Geneva, with services connecting to Paris and as far as Marseille, operated by TGV Lyria, a joint company owned by the SNCF and the Swiss Federal Railways. The SNCF also operates regional train services to Lyon.

The public transport of Geneva is operated by Transports Publics Genevois, which on average carry a total of 200 million passengers per year on its extensive network of trams, trolleybuses, buses, and boats, and by Lemanis, which operates the suburban rail network, the Léman Express. All the operators of the region operate under Unireso, so any ticket is valid in all the network within the canton as well as in France.

After the inauguration of the missing rail link between Geneva and the border French city of Annemasse and the creation of the Léman Express in 2019, many secondary bus routes were re-designed as feeders to the new train stations. Soon after the opening of the rail network and prior to the COVID-19 crisis in 2020, it had met all its expectations in terms of passenger numbers with 25,000 daily users. Several municipalities of the canton, especially those in the Mandement (Satigny, Russin, Dardagny), and those on the right-bank of the lake (from Chambésy to Versoix) rely heavily on the rail for their commuting.

The tram network is also an important element of cohesion of the canton, linking the city of Geneva to its dense urban surroundings formed by large municipalities such as Lancy, Meyrin, Vernier, Onex or Bernex. Several extensions of the network are planned for the near future, including an extension towards the French city of Saint-Julien-en-Genevois via Plan-les-Ouates, and towards Grand Saconnex near the airport.

In 1964, the first Swiss motorway, the A1, was built between Geneva and Lausanne as part of the investments carried out for the Swiss national exposition of 1964, and later it was extended all the way to the border with Austria. The canton is also linked to the French motorway system with the A40 autoroute, offering a speedy access to the Mont Blanc tunnel.

Education 
The main educational institution is the University of Geneva, founded in 1559 by John Calvin. It was originally called Schola Genevensis. The original buildings are no longer used by the university, and are now used by Collège Calvin.

The public system starts from the age of 4 in one of the 165 primary schools of the canton. This is followed in one of the 19 cycle d'orientation from the ages of 12 to 15. Students then choose to follow an academic route in one of the 11 collèges, or an apprenticeship/general studies in one of the 14 specialised schools.

In addition, the canton's private schools have a good reputation for academic excellence. Many of these schools, such as the International School of Geneva, and Institut Florimont, also offer the International Baccalaureate. This programme was founded in Geneva in the 1960s and it is still headquartered in the canton.

Culture
The Jeûne genevois is a public holiday specific to Geneva, celebrated on the Thursday following the first Sunday of September.

L'Escalade, or Fête de l'Escalade (from escalade, the act of scaling defensive walls), is an annual festival held in December in Geneva, Switzerland, celebrating the defeat of the surprise attack by troops sent by Charles Emmanuel I, Duke of Savoy during the night of 11–12 December 1602 (Old style). The celebrations and other commemorative activities are usually held on 12 December or the closest weekend.

References

External links 

 Official page 
 Official statistics

 
Cantons of Switzerland
Canton of Geneva
Wine regions of Switzerland
Arpitania
1815 establishments in Switzerland
States and territories established in 1815
Former republics